American country music singer and songwriter Chase Rice has released six studio albums, four extended plays, and twelve singles. After a number of independent releases, Rice signed to Columbia Records Nashville in 2014 and recorded his breakthrough album Ignite the Night. This album was certified gold by the Recording Industry Association of America (RIAA); it also produced the singles "Ready Set Roll" and "Gonna Wanna Tonight", which were top-ten hits on the Billboard Hot Country Songs and Country Airplay charts.

After exiting Columbia Nashville, Rice signed to Broken Bow Records (now known as BBR Music Group), for whom he released two more albums: Lambs & Lions in 2017 and The Album three years later. The former accounted for the single "Eyes on You", his first number-one single on Country Airplay. The Album produced another number-one single on that chart with "Drinkin' Beer. Talkin' God. Amen.", a collaboration with Florida Georgia Line.

Studio albums

Extended plays

Singles

Other singles

Guest singles

Other charted songs

Music videos

Notes

References

Country music discographies
Discographies of American artists